Elzie Wylie "Buddy" Baker Jr. (January 25, 1941 – August 10, 2015) was an American professional stock car racing driver and commentator. Over the course of his 33-year racing career, he won 19 races in the NASCAR Cup Series, including the 1980 Daytona 500. Known by the nickname "Gentle Giant," Baker was noted for his prowess at NASCAR's superspeedways, Daytona and Talladega, at which he won a combined six races. After his racing career, he worked as a broadcaster and co-hosted a number of radio shows on Sirius XM.

Early life

Baker was born on January 25, 1941, in Florence, South Carolina, the son of two-time NASCAR champion Buck Baker. A high school athlete, Baker began racing in 1958 at age 17, and started his NASCAR career the following year. As a teenager, he idolized many of NASCAR's top drivers, including his father and Fireball Roberts, and he studied them closely during his early NASCAR career.

Career
Baker won his first race in 1967, winning the National 500 at Charlotte Motor Speedway. On March 24, 1970, he became the first driver ever to exceed 200 mph (320 km/h) on a closed course, accomplishing the feat while testing his blue Dodge Daytona. He became known for his skill at superspeedways; in his career, he won four races at Talladega and two at Daytona, including the 1980 Daytona 500. Baker's victory in that race remains the fastest Daytona 500 in NASCAR history, posting an average speed of 177.602 mph (285.809 km/h).

He is one of nine drivers to have accomplished a Career Grand Slam, a feat which involves winning NASCAR's four most prestigious races: the Daytona 500, Aaron's 499, Coca-Cola 600, and Southern 500. The only other drivers to have accomplished this feat are Richard Petty, David Pearson, Bobby Allison, Darrell Waltrip, Dale Earnhardt, Jeff Gordon, Jimmie Johnson, Kevin Harvick, and Denny Hamlin. Of the ten, Baker is one of two to have never won an Cup Series championship. He generally raced part-time, having only raced three full seasons, and co-owned his car from 1985 to 1989. He competed in two International Race of Champions series, IROC IV and IROC VII, and helped run the Buck Baker Racing School with his brother for a number of years.

Baker retired from NASCAR in 1992, finishing with 19 career victories. His 1,099 laps led at Talladega Superspeedway remain the track's all-time career record.

Broadcasting career and later life
After his retirement, Baker became a television broadcaster, acting as an analyst initially for The Nashville Network beginning in 1991, and later for TBS and CBS beginning in 1996. As a commentator, he helped call some of the most legendary moments in NASCAR history, including the first Winston All-Star Race held at night, the last 500-mile race at Dover in 1997, Dale Earnhardt's only Daytona 500 win, and the first race at Daytona to be held under the lights in Prime Time.  He remained with all 3 networks until the new consolidated television package took effect beginning with the 2001 season, after which he stepped away from the broadcasting booth.

In 2007, Baker became the part-time co-host of "The Driver's Seat" with John Kernan on Sirius XM's new NASCAR Radio channel. He later became a regular on "Tradin' Paint" with Steve Post and co-host on "Late Shift" with Alex Hayden.

On July 7, 2015, Baker announced his retirement from broadcasting, and revealed that he had been diagnosed with lung cancer. During his final broadcast, he told his audience, "Do not shed a tear. Give a smile when you say my name".

Baker died on August 10, 2015, at his home in Catawba County, North Carolina. During the August 2015 race weekend at Michigan International Speedway, the drivers in all three NASCAR series placed stickers on their cars to honor Baker's legacy.

Awards
In 1997, Baker was inducted into the International Motorsports Hall of Fame in Talladega, Alabama, and the National Motorsports Press Association Hall of Fame. He was named one of NASCAR's 50 Greatest Drivers in 1998.

He was inducted into the Motorsports Hall of Fame of America in 2008, and the NASCAR Hall of Fame in January 2020.

Motorsports career results

NASCAR
(key) (Bold – Pole position awarded by qualifying time. Italics – Pole position earned by points standings or practice time. * – Most laps led.)

Grand National Series

Winston Cup Series

Daytona 500 results

International Race of Champions
(key) (Bold – Pole position. * – Most laps led.)

References

External links
Official website

The Inside Groove.com – Historical Nascar Image Gallery
 
Actual footage of Buddy Baker setting the 200 mph world record in the No. 88 Chrysler Engineering Charger Daytona
Profile, aerowarriors.com

1941 births
2015 deaths
American television sports announcers
Deaths from lung cancer in North Carolina
International Motorsports Hall of Fame inductees
International Race of Champions drivers
Motorsport announcers
NASCAR drivers
NASCAR team owners
Sportspeople from Florence, South Carolina
Racing drivers from South Carolina
NASCAR Hall of Fame inductees